Scooby-Doo! and the Goblin King is a 2008 direct-to-DVD animated comedy horror film, and the twelfth in the series of Scooby-Doo direct-to-video films produced by Warner Bros. Animation (though it used a Hanna-Barbera logo at the end of the film). It was dedicated to Paulette Oates, who helped resurrect Warner Bros. Animation in the late 1980s. All the main voice actors of Mystery, Inc. reprise their roles. The DVD was released on September 23, 2008. This is the first Scooby cartoon produced entirely without either one of the original producers, William Hanna and Joseph Barbera.

This film calls back to the shared premise of The Boo Brothers, The Ghoul School, and The Reluctant Werewolf films from the late 1980s, where the fantastical elements of the story are genuine, and Scooby and Shaggy alone discover and befriend an entire society of supernatural beings.

Plot 
The Mystery, Inc. gang goes to the annual Coolsville Halloween carnival on Halloween night. While there, they encounter the resident magician "The Amazing Krudsky" (voiced by Wayne Knight) who refuses to allow Scooby to see his show after an accident. In retaliation, he and Shaggy, who feel that Halloween is the one night of the year where the usual scares have to be fake, expose Krudsky as a fraud during one of his acts, causing his audience to walk out and Krudsky to swear revenge on the duo. The gang gets thrown out of the carnival and decide to go trick-or-treating instead.

In his tent, Krudsky reveals his desire to become a real magician. The Fairy Princess Willow (voiced by Hayden Panettiere) enters Krudsky's tent and accidentally causes Krudsky to notice an entry about the Goblin Scepter in a spellbook, which can be combined with fairy magic to control Halloween. Krudsky then gets an idea to obtain the scepter and rule the world with it. Willow decides to toy with him, but knocks herself out; Krudsky sees that she is a fairy and absorbs her magical powers, thus becoming a real magician.

Meanwhile, Shaggy's and Scooby's last stop trick-or-treating is a spooky-looking house which claims to be a "genuine magic shoppe". Once inside, a thunderstorm begins, frightening them. The proprietor of the magic shop, Mr. Gibbles (voiced by Wallace Shawn) reveals to the duo that magic really does exist. Krudksy enters the shop chasing Willow, captures her, and then turns Gibbles into a rabbit and steals the magic equipment before leaving. Mr. Gibbles explains Krudsky's plan to Shaggy and Scooby and shows them a vision of Krudsky turning their friends into monsters, horrifying the two. Gibbles gets them to board the Grim Reaper Railway which will fly them to the spirit world, warning them that they have to return home before sunrise or else they will be trapped in the spirit world forever. Before they depart, Shaggy and Scooby are magically disguised with the use of temporary magic cards into monster-like versions of themselves.

Meanwhile, while looking for Shaggy and Scooby back in the real world, the rest of the gang see Krudsky conversing with the Goblin King (voiced by Tim Curry) through a mirror who reluctantly agrees to exchange his scepter for Princess Willow at midnight. Seeing all the magic causes the overly rational Velma to fall unconscious; Fred and Daphne leave Velma to rest in the mystery machine while they set a trap for both the Goblin King and Krudsky.

In the magic world, Shaggy and Scooby's disguises disappear as they encounter a werewolf. In order to get past him, they convince him that they are collectively a werewolf. Fooled, he brings them to a monster-filled bar. During the song "Bump in the Night", Shaggy adds in a lyric asking how to get to the Goblin King's castle, terrifying all of the monsters into running away. The Goblin King's two bumbling goblin henchmen, Glob and Glum (voiced by James Belushi and Larry Joe Campbell), attempt to capture Scooby and Shaggy, but are stopped by Jack O'Lantern (voiced by Jay Leno). The trio then encounters the Headless Horseman who wants Jack for a pumpkin head. They escape the Horseman and arrive at the Witches' Hut where they meet the Grand Witch (voiced by Lauren Bacall) and her two fellow witches (voiced by Grey DeLisle and Russi Taylor). The witches send Shaggy and Scooby on a ride on their flying broomstick towards the Goblin King's castle, but they are shot down by Glob and Glum by a goblin cannon.

Crash-landing in a small fairy village in a forest, Shaggy and Scooby find three fairies named Sparkplug, Honeybee and Tiddlywink, who help them to the Goblin King's castle entrance. Using a potion from the witches (apparently made from someone called "Scratch"), Shaggy and Scooby disguise themselves as Daphne and Velma in order to get inside the castle. Only a few minutes away from midnight, Shaggy and Scooby try to steal the scepter from the Goblin King but are captured when their disguises wear off and sent to the tower dungeon.

Back in the mortal world, Krudsky and the Goblin King are almost through with their trade when Fred and Daphne spring a trap, only managing to catch the Goblin King. Krudsky takes the scepter, turning himself into the new Goblin King before turning the Goblin King into a goose. Krudsky and his new goblin army set off to take over the world. He turns the Mystery Machine into a living monster vehicle called the "Monstrous Machine" to chase Fred, Daphne, Velma, and Willow. The goblins capture the three and Krudsky uses his newfound powers to turn Fred into a vampire, Daphne into a witch, and Velma into a werewolf (fulfilling the terrifying vision that Scooby and Shaggy were shown by Mr. Gibbles earlier).

At that moment, Scooby, Shaggy and Jack O'Lantern arrive, having been saved from the dungeon before sunrise by the fairies and Broomy. Jack sacrifices himself, making Krudsky drop the staff. Scooby then uses the staff to break Krudsky's spells before returning it to the Goblin King, who is revealed to be Princess Willow's father. The Goblin King holds his daughter responsible for all the trouble caused and punishes her by declaring her grounded for a year, though he admits he's relieved to have her back and safe. Mr. Gibbles brings Jack back to life with the Goblin King's help as the latter takes Krudsky prisoner for his crimes. He, the goblin army, Willow, Jack, Broomy and Mr. Gibbles all return to the magical world. Before departing, the Goblin King uses one final spell to erase the memory of the events from Fred, Daphne, and Velma's minds, to keep the balance between the worlds. However, Scooby and Shaggy are allowed to keep their memories as they have proven their courage.

Voice cast 
 Frank Welker - Scooby-Doo, Fred Jones
 Casey Kasem - Shaggy Rogers
 Mindy Cohn - Velma Dinkley
 Grey DeLisle - Daphne Blake, Cat Witch, Honeybee
 Wayne Knight - The Amazing Krudsky
 Jay Leno - Jack O'Lantern
 Wallace Shawn - Mr. Gibbles
 Tim Curry - The Goblin King, Werewolf
 Jim Belushi - Glob
 Larry Joe Campbell - Glum
 Hayden Panettiere - Fairy Princess Willow
 Lauren Bacall - The Grand Witch
 Thom Adcox-Hernandez - Sparkplug
 Russi Taylor - Owl Witch, Tiddlywink

Original Songs 

 "Who's at the Door?" - Sung by Wallace Shawn
 "Bump in the Night" - Sung by the Halloween Monsters
 "Goblin Oogie Boogie" - Sung by Jim Belushi

References

External links 

 Reuters
 

2008 animated films
2008 films
2008 direct-to-video films
2000s American animated films
2000s monster movies
American children's animated mystery films
American monster movies
Films about fairies and sprites
American films about Halloween
Films about magic and magicians
Films about magic
Fictional goblins
Goblin films
Films about parallel universes
Scooby-Doo direct-to-video animated films
Warner Bros. Animation animated films
Warner Bros. direct-to-video animated films
Films about witchcraft
2000s children's animated films
Films directed by Joe Sichta
2000s English-language films